The Old Donkey is a 2010 Chinese film written, edited and directed by Li Ruijun.

It made its world premiere at the 15th Busan International Film Festival in 2010.

Synopsis

Cast
 Ma Xingchun as Ma
 Zhang Min as Ma Lianhua
 Sun Chunyan as Zhang Yongfu
 Wang Dazhi as Ma Dazhi

Awards and nominations

Production
Li started filming The Old Donkey in 2006.

References

External links
 
 

2010 films
Chinese drama films
Films directed by Li Ruijun
2010s Mandarin-language films